The Burundian records in swimming are the fastest ever performances of swimmers from the Burundi, which are recognised and ratified by the Federation Burundaise de Natation.

All records were set in finals unless noted otherwise.

Long Course (50 m)

Men

Women

Short Course (25 m)

Men

Women

References

Burundi
Records
Swimming